2013 Azerbaijan Supercup was the 4th edition of the Azerbaijan Supercup since its establishment in 1992. The match was contested between the 2012–13 Azerbaijan Premier League champions Neftchi Baku and the 2012–13 Azerbaijan Cup finalists Khazar Lankaran.

Match

Details

See also
 2012–13 Azerbaijan Premier League
 2012–13 Azerbaijan Cup

References

2013
Supercup
Neftçi PFK matches
Khazar Lankaran FK matches